The 2007 Louisiana–Monroe Warhawks football team represented the University of Louisiana at Monroe in the 2007 NCAA Division I FBS football season. The Warhawks offense scored 282 points while the defense allowed 332 points.

Schedule

References

Louisiana–Monroe
Louisiana–Monroe Warhawks football seasons
Louisiana–Monroe Warhawks football